Mauidrillia felina is a species of sea snail, a marine gastropod mollusk in the family Horaiclavidae.

Description
The length of the shell attains , its diameter .

Distribution
This marine species occurs on the continental slope of western Transkei, South Africa, at depths between 300–446 m.

References

External links
 Kilburn, R. N. "Turridae (Mollusca: Gastropoda) of southern Africa and Mozambique. Part 4. Subfamilies Drilliinae, Crassispirinae and Strictispirinae." Annals of the Natal Museum 29.1 (1988): 167–320.

Endemic fauna of South Africa
felina
Gastropods described in 1988